José Morales (born 1901, date of death unknown) was a Mexican modern pentathlete. He competed at the 1932 Summer Olympics.

References

External links
 

1901 births
Year of death missing
Mexican male modern pentathletes
Olympic modern pentathletes of Mexico
Modern pentathletes at the 1932 Summer Olympics